The Puerto Rico Soccer League Regular Season Cup, first played in 2008, is an annual league competition for Puerto Rico Soccer League. The top four teams advance to the PlayOff cup.

History

Puerto Rico Soccer League Regular Season Champions by Season

2008 Puerto Rico Soccer League regular season
The 2008 Puerto Rico Soccer League season is the first season that the league has been held. It had eight teams playing and the top four teams advanced to the PlayOffs cup, where semi-final matches were played to determine the teams moving to the championship game. This year, the Sevilla FC Bayamón won both the Regular Season and the PlayOffs cup. The team them took both cups to Spain and gave them to the main club Sevilla FC in a ceremony at the star of La Liga.

2009 Puerto Rico Soccer League regular season
The 2009 Puerto Rico Soccer League season saw the addition of a ninth team, the Bayamón FC, which ended up winning the PlayOffs cup. Nevertheless, the CA River Plate Ponce had an undefeated season, winning the Regular Season cup.

2010 Puerto Rico Soccer League regular season
The 2010 season was suspended. In its place, the Súper Copa DirectTV was held to determine Puerto Rico's representatives at the 2011 CFU Club Championship.

2011 Puerto Rico Soccer League regular season
During the 2011 Puerto Rico Soccer League season, several teams decided not to compete. The total number of team playing was reduced to six. Out of the nine teams that played the 2009 season, only three remained. The 2011 expansion team was FC Leones de Ponce, which ended up winning the PlayOffs cup. The other two teams (Mayagüez FC & Puerto Rico United SC) had already played the 2010 cup. The Sevilla FC Juncos won its second Regular Season cup.

* Mayagüez FC (fifth placed) replaced the fourth placed Puerto Rico United SC in the PlayOffs cup as PR United SC had been suspended by PRSL.

See also

 Puerto Rican Football Federation
 Puerto Rico national football team
 Puerto Rico U-20 national football team
 Liga Nacional de Futbol de Puerto Rico
 Association Football in Puerto Rico
 Puerto Rico Islanders

References

External links
Federación Puertorriqueña de Fútbol
 Futbol de Puerto Rico

Regular
Defunct football competitions in Puerto Rico